François Bovon (13 March 1938 – 1 November 2013) was a Swiss biblical scholar and historian of early Christianity. He was the Frothingham Professor Emeritus of the History of Religion at Harvard Divinity School. Bovon was a graduate of the University of Lausanne and held a doctorate in theology from the University of Basel (supervised by Oscar Cullmann). From 1967 to 1993, he taught in the Faculty of Theology at the University of Geneva. Bovon was an honorary professor at the University of Geneva and in 1993 he received an honorary doctorate from the Faculty of 
Theology at Uppsala University, Sweden. He was president of the Swiss Society of Theology from 1973 to 1977 and president of the Studiorum Novi Testamenti Societas in 2000.

Bovon was the author of numerous books on early Christianity, and co-edited the first volume of Écrits apocryphes chrétiens in the series La Pléiade (published by Gallimard). He also wrote several books on Luke the Evangelist and the Gospel of Luke, including a major critical commentary (in the series EKK).

Select publications
 
 
  - (trans pub by Neuchâtel: Delachaux et Niestlé in 1978)

References

1938 births
People from Lausanne
Swiss Protestant theologians
Swiss historians of religion
Swiss biblical scholars
New Testament scholars
University of Lausanne alumni
University of Basel alumni
Academic staff of the University of Geneva
Harvard Divinity School faculty
2013 deaths